The 22665 / 22666 KSR Bengaluru City – Coimbatore Uday Express is the 1st Uday Express series double-decker AC chair train of the Indian Railways connecting  in Karnataka and  in Tamil Nadu. It is currently being operated with 22665/22666 train numbers on Six Days a week basis. It operates at an average speed of 65 km/h.

Coach composition

Utkrisht Double Decker Air Conditioned Yatri Express will be double-decker train trains with 40% additional passenger capacity. They will run overnight on busy route by Indian Railways with features of LED screen display to show information about stations, train speed etc. and will have announcement system as well, Vending machines for tea, coffee and milk, Bio toilets in compartments as well as CCTV cameras.

This UDAY Express when introduced had a total of 10 AC coaches; 3 coaches with dining facility with seating capacity of 104 seats each and 5 coaches without dining with seating capacity of 120 seats. The remaining two will be power cars. However, because of low occupancy by passengers, 3 coaches of Double Decker AC Chair Car were replaced with 5 non-AC Chair Car making it a 12 coaches train.

Service

It averages 62 km/hr as 22665 Uday Express starts from  covering 419 km in 6 hrs 45 mins & 61 km/hr as 22666 Uday Express starts from  covering 419 km in 6 hrs 55 min.

Schedule 
The schedule of this 22666/22665 KSR Bengaluru - Coimbatore Jn UDAY Express is given below:-

Traction

Both trains are hauled by a WAP-7 of Royapuram / Erode Locomotive Shed on its entire journey.

Route & halts

See also

Chennai–Bangalore Double Decker Express
Visakhapatnam–Vijayawada Uday Express
Uday Express

References

External links 

 22665/KSR Bengaluru - Coimbatore Uday Express
 22666/Coimbatore - KSR Bengaluru Uday Express

Uday Express trains
Transport in Bangalore
Transport in Coimbatore
Rail transport in Andhra Pradesh
Rail transport in Karnataka
Rail transport in Tamil Nadu
Railway services introduced in 2018